Zeuctoboarmia is a genus of moths in the family Geometridae erected by Louis Beethoven Prout in 1915.

Species
Zeuctoboarmia contortilinea (Warren, 1897) Congo
Zeuctoboarmia hyrax (Townsend, 1952)
Zeuctoboarmia pectinata (Warren, 1897)
Zeuctoboarmia sabinei (Prout, 1915) Zimbabwe
Zeuctoboarmia simplex (Warren, 1898)
Zeuctoboarmia smithi (Warren, 1902) Congo
Zeuctoboarmia translata Prout, 1915 Kenya

References

Geometridae